Other people's money (OPM) may refer to:

Adam Smith's phrase in The Wealth of Nations (1776) Book V, ch 1, §107, that corporate directors will always be inefficient, because they preside over other people's money
The principal–agent problem in economics; the modern formulation of Smith's observation
Other People's Money and How the Bankers Use It, 1914 book by Louis Brandeis
Other People's Money, 1916 American silent film with Gladys Hulette and Kathryn Adams (actress, born 1893)
Other People's Money (play), 1987 American stage drama by Jerry Sterner
Other People's Money, 1991 American drama/comedy film based on Sterner play, starring Danny DeVito and Gregory Peck
Other People's Money (novel), 2011 British novel by Justin Cartwright